Cheney's Grove Township is located in McLean County, Illinois. As of the 2010 census, its population was 997 and it contained 454 housing units.

Geography

Demographics

References

External links
City-data.com
Illinois State Archives

Townships in McLean County, Illinois
Populated places established in 1857
Townships in Illinois
1857 establishments in Illinois